Goetghebueromyia is a genus of flies in the family Stratiomyidae.

Distribution
Congo.

Species
Goetghebueromyia paradoxa Lindner, 1938

References

Stratiomyidae
Brachycera genera
Taxa named by Erwin Lindner
Diptera of Africa
Endemic fauna of the Democratic Republic of the Congo